Chris Ahrens may refer to:

Chris Ahrens (ice hockey) (born 1952), retired American ice hockey player
Chris Ahrens (rower) (born 1976), American rower
Chris Ahrens (born 1984), United States men's Paralympic soccer team defenseman

See also
Princeton University Olympians